The Prix Jean Vigo is an award in the Cinema of France given annually since 1951 to a French film director in homage to Jean Vigo. It was founded by French writer Claude Aveline. Since 1960, the award is given to a director of a feature film and to a director of a short film.

The award is usually given to a young director, for their independent spirit and stylistic originality.

History 
The Jean Vigo Prize has been awarded since 1951 as a tribute to film director Jean Vigo. It was created by Claude Aveline, the executor of Jean Vigo's will, Vigo's daughter Luce Vigo, and a number of filmmakers. Members of the first jury in 1951 included Jacques Becker, Jean Cocteau, Paul Gilson, Georges Sadoul, and Luce Vigo. 

The award recognizes films "for their inventiveness, originality and intellectual independence." The goal of the award is to "recognize a future auteur, [to] discover through him a passion and a gift," according to the 2018 jury.

Winners

1950s 
1951: La Montagne est verte (short) by Jean Leherissey
1952: La Grande Vie by Henri Schneider
1953: Crin Blanc (short) by Albert Lamorisse
1954: Les statues meurent aussi (short) by Alain Resnais and Chris Marker
1955: Émile Zola (short) by Jean Vidal
1956: Nuit et brouillard (short) by Alain Resnais
1957: Léon la lune (short) by Alain Jessua
1958: Les Femmes de Stermetz (short) by Louis Grospierre
1959: Le beau Serge by Claude Chabrol

Feature film

1960s 
1960: À bout de souffle  by Jean-Luc Godard
1961: La Peau et les os by Jean-Paul Sassy and Jacques Panuel
1962: La Guerre des boutons by Yves Robert
1963: Mourir à Madrid by Frédéric Rossif
1964: La Belle Vie by Robert Enrico
1965: not awarded
1966: La Noire de... by Ousmane Sembène
1967: Who Are You, Polly Magoo? by William Klein
1968: O Salto by Christian de Chalonge
1969: L'Enfance nue by Maurice Pialat

1970s 
1970: Hoa Binh by Raoul Coutard
1971: Remparts d'argile by Jean-Louis Bertucelli
1972: Continental Circus by Jérôme Laperroussaz
1973: Absences répétées by Guy Gilles
1974: Un homme qui dort by Bernard Queyssanne and Georges Perec
1975: Histoire de Paul by René Féret
1976: L'Affiche rouge by Frank Cassenti
1977: Paradiso by Christian Bricout
1978: Bako-l'autre rive by Jacques Champreux
1979: Certaines nouvelles by Jacques Davila

1980s 
1980: Ma blonde entends-tu dans la ville ? by René Gilson
1981: Le Jardinier by Jean-Pierre Sentier
1982: L'Enfant secret by Philippe Garrel
1984: Vive la sociale! by Gérard Mordillat
1985: Le Thé au harem d'Archimède by Medhi Charef
1986: Maine Océan by Jacques Rozier
1987: Buisson ardent by Laurent Perrin
1988: La Comédie du travail by Luc Moullet
1989: Chine ma douleur by Sijie Daï

1990s 
1990: Mona et moi by Patrick Grandperret
1991: Le Brasier by Eric Barbier
1992: Paris s'éveille by Olivier Assayas
1993: Les histoires d'amour finissent mal... en général by Anne Fontaine
1994: Trop de bonheur by Cédric Kahn
1995: N'oublie pas que tu vas mourir by Xavier Beauvois
1996: Encore by Pascal Bonitzer
1997: La Vie de Jésus by Bruno Dumont
1998: Dis-moi que je rêve by Claude Mourieras
1999: La vie ne me fait pas peur by Noémie Lvoski

2000s 
2000: 
Saint-Cyr by Patricia Mazuy 
De l'histoire ancienne by Orso Miret
2000: Les Filles de mon pays (short) by Yves Caumon
2001: Candidature by Emmanuel Bourdieu ex-æquo with Ce vieux rêve qui bouge by Alain Guiraudie
2002: Royal Bonbon by Charles Najman
2003: Toutes ces belles promesses by Jean-Paul Civeyrac
2004: Quand je serai star by Patrick Mimouni
2005: Les Yeux clairs by Jérôme Bonnell
2006: Le Dernier des fous  by  Laurent Achard
2007: La France  by Serge Bozon
2008: Nulle part, terre promise by Emmanuel Finkiel
2009: L'Arbre et la Forêt by Olivier Ducastel and Jacques Martineau

2010s 
2010: Un poison violent by Katell Quillévéré
2011: Les Chants de Mandrin by Rabah Ameur-Zaïmeche
2012: L'Âge atomique by Héléna Klotz
2013: L'Enclos du temps by Jean-Charles Fitoussi
2014: Mange tes morts by Jean-Charles Hue
2015: La Peur by Damien Odoul
2016: La Mort de Louis XIV by Albert Serra
2017: Barbara by Mathieu Amalric
2018: Shéhérazade by Jean-Bernard Marlin ex-æquo with Knife+Heart by Yann Gonzalez
2019: Vif-Argent by Stéphane Batut

2020s 
2020: Énorme by Sophie Letourneur
2021: Petite Solange by Axelle Ropert
2022: Saint Omer by Alice Diop

Short film

1960s 
 1960: Enfants des courants d'air by Édouard Luntz 
 1961: not awarded
 1962: 10 juin 1944 by Maurice Cohen
 1963: La Jetée by Chris Marker
 1964: La Saint-Firmin by Robert Destanque
 1965: Fait à Coaraze by Gérard Belkin
 1966: not awarded
 1967: not awarded
 1968: Désirée by Fernand Moszkowicz
 1969: Le Deuxième Ciel by Louis-Roger

1970s 
 1970: La Passion selon Florimond by Laurent Gomes
 1971: Derniers hivers by Jean-Charles Tacchella
 1972: not awarded
 1973: Le Soldat et les trois sœurs by Pascal Aubier
 1974: Septembre chilien by Bruno Muel and Théo Robichet
 1975: La Corrida by Christian Broutin
 1976: Caméra by Christian Paureilhe
 1977: not awarded
 1978: not awarded
 1979: Nuit féline by Gérard Marx

1980s 
 1980: not awarded
 1981: not awarded
 1982: Lourdes, l'hiver by Marie-Claude Treilhou
 1983: La Fonte de Barlaeus by Pierre-Henri Salfati
 1984: not awarded
 1985: Épopine ou le Fer à repasser by Michel Chion
 1986: Poussières d'étoiles by Agnès Merlet
 1987: Pondichéry, juste avant l'oubli by Joël Fargès
 1988: Elle et lui by François Margolin
 1989: Le Porte-plume by Marie-Christine Perrodin

1990s 
 1990: Elli Fat Man by Michel Such
 1991: La Vie des morts by Arnaud Desplechin
 1992: Des filles et des chiens by Sophie Fillières
 1993: Faits et gestes by Emmanuel Descombes
 1994: 75 centilitres de prières by Jacques Maillot
 1995: Tous à la manif by Laurent Cantet
 1996: not awarded
 1997: Soyons amis ! by Thomas Bardinet
 1998: Les Corps ouverts by Sébastien Lifshitz
 1999: Le Bleu du ciel by Christian Dor

2000s 
 2000: Les Filles de mon pays by Yves Caumon
 2001: Ce vieux rêve qui bouge by Alain Guiraudie 
 2002: L'Arpenteur by Michel Klein and Sarah Petit
 2003: La Coupure by Nathalie Loubeyre
 2004: La nuit sera longue by Olivier Torres
 2005: La Peau trouée by Julien Samani
 2006: De sortie by Thomas Salvador
 2007:  by  
 2008: Les Paradis perdus by Hélier Cisterne
 2009: Montparnasse by Mikhael Hers

2010s 
 2010: La République by Nicolas Pariser
 2011: La Dame au chien by Damien Manivel
 2012: 
La Règle de trois by Louis Garrel 
La Vie Parisienne by Vincent Dietschy
 2013: Le Quepa sur la vilni ! by Yann Le Quellec
 2014: Inupiluk by Sébastien Betbeder
 2015: Le Dernier des Céfrans by Pierre-Emmanuel Urcun
 2016: Le Gouffre by Vincent Le Port
2017: Le Film de l'été by Emmanuel Marre
2018: L'Amie du dimanche by Guillaume Brac
2019: Braquer Poitiers by Claude Schmitz

2020s 
2020: Un adieu by Mathilde Profit
2021: Le Roi David

Prix Jean Vigo in Spain

The Spanish documentary film Punto de Vista International Documentary Film Festival 1 presents, for the first time in Spain, the Premio Jean Vigo al mejor director (Jean Vigo Prize to the best director).

The new award aims to strengthen both the spirit which inspired the festival in the first place and its commitment to the work of Jean Vigo. The creation of this prize has been made possible thanks to the close ties between Punto de Vista and the family of the French filmmaker.

Punto de Vista paid tribute to the director of Zero de Conduite on the 2005 centenary of his birth. Luce Vigo, film critic and daughter of Vigo and Elizabeth Lozinska, attended that year. The festival provided an opportunity to look back on Vigo’s entire filmography and also represented the first step in a relationship which has now fructified in the form of this award. The Festival took its name, Punto de Vista (Point of View), as a tribute to Vigo, the first director to refer, back in the 1930s, to a “documented point of view” as a distinctive sign of a form of filmmaking which commits the filmmaker.

References

External links 
 

French film awards
Spanish film awards
Awards established in 1951
1951 establishments in France